Joke van Beusekom (born 23 June 1952 in Wassenaar, South Holland) is a retired female badminton player from the Netherlands.

Career
Nationally, she was the most successful Dutch female player, winning a record 25 Dutch titles and playing, between 1967 and 1983, 67 times for the Dutch team.

Internationally she was most successful in women's doubles,  usually partnered with Marjan Luesken (later "Ridder"), winning at the (first) European Youth Championships in 1969, the Denmark Open in 1972 and 1975, the Irish International in 1975 (where she also won the singles title), and the Dutch Open in 1977. Van Beusekom and Luesken further earned bronze at the 1968, 1974, and 1978 European Championships, and silver at the (first) World Championships in 1977 in Malmö.

References

 globalxs

1952 births
Living people
Dutch female badminton players
People from Wassenaar
Badminton players at the 1972 Summer Olympics
Sportspeople from South Holland